Juan Jose Mendez (born May 18, 1985) is an American politician and State Senator from Arizona. He is a member of the Democratic Party.

Education
Born and raised in Arizona, Mendez attended Tolleson Union High School and received an associate degree from Phoenix College. He later received a bachelor's degree from Arizona State University, majoring in political science.

Career
Mendez was elected to the Arizona House of Representatives in 2012. He served on the Insurance and Retirement Committee and the Reform and Human Services Committee.

Mendez supports closing "tax loopholes" for out-of-state corporations, raising education funding, and more restrictions on gifts to legislators. He opposes Arizona SB 1070 and allowing guns in schools.

Mendez is an atheist, and one of few atheist politicians serving in the United States. Mendez gained national attention in 2013 for choosing to open a House meeting with a secular speech, rather than a traditional religious prayer. During his speech, Mendez quoted astronomer Carl Sagan.

Mendez, along with fellow representatives Clark, Hale, Larkin, and Mach, introduced HB2283 in 2016 to enact Ranked-Choice Voting for all Arizona elections. The text of the bill contained provisions for Instant Runoff Voting, for single-seat positions, and for Single Transferable Vote, for multi-seat positions. It also contained provisions to educate voters on Ranked-Choice Voting, and to ensure voting machines would be compliant with ranked ballots. The bill was referred to both the House Elections Committee and the House Rules Committee, but received no action in either committee, and received no floor votes.

Mendez serves on the City of Phoenix Human Services Advisory Committee, and manages the nonprofit Community Voice Mail, an organization devoted to helping the impoverished.

In 2018, Juan Mendez was accused by a right-leaning website, which was confirmed by The Arizona Republic, of plagiarizing some responses to a questionnaire.

In 2023, Mendez became the Ranking Member of the Senate Committee on Elections.

Personal life 
In mid-March 2019, Mendez became engaged to fellow legislator, Arizona Representative Athena Salman and they will get married in 2022.

References

External links

 Official page at the Arizona State Legislature
 Campaign Website
 
 Biography at Ballotpedia
 Financial information (state office) at OpenSecrets

1985 births
Living people
American atheists
Arizona State University alumni
Hispanic and Latino American state legislators in Arizona
Hispanic and Latino American women in politics
Democratic Party members of the Arizona House of Representatives
Politicians from Tempe, Arizona
Phoenix College alumni
21st-century American politicians
Democratic Party Arizona state senators